Pridinol, sold under the brand name Myopridin, is a muscle relaxant that is used as an antiparkinsonian and anticholinergic drug.

It was approved for medical use in the UK in May 2020.

References

External links 
 

1-Piperidinyl compounds
Tertiary alcohols
Muscle relaxants
Antiparkinsonian agents
Muscarinic antagonists
Benzhydryl compounds